The R280 road is a regional road in Ireland linking Bundoran in County Donegal in the north to Carrick-on-Shannon in County Leitrim.

En route it passes through Kinlough, Manorhamilton, Drumkeeran and Leitrim village.

See also
Roads in Ireland
National primary road
National secondary road

References
Roads Act 1993 (Classification of Regional Roads) Order 2006 – Department of Transport

Regional roads in the Republic of Ireland
Roads in County Donegal
Roads in County Leitrim
Roads in County Roscommon